Daryl Austin is an Australian painter and arts educator, best known for portraiture. He has won several art prizes including the Heysen Landscape Prize 2018 and the Whyalla Art Prize in 1998 and 2002.

Biography 
Daryl Austin was born in Lincoln in the UK in 1964. He earned a Bachelor of Arts from the South Australian College of Advanced Education (now University of South Australia) in 1986.  He has worked at the South Australian Museum and began teaching at Adelaide Central School of Art in 2001. His paintings are held in the Art Gallery of South Australia.

Artistic style and subject 
Austin is a realist painter best known for his portraiture and has undertaken commissions for the South Australian Parliament and the University of Adelaide. In recent years, he has experimented with fictional portraits based on vintage photographs.

Awards/prizes/residencies 
 Heysen Landscape Prize 2018
 Royal South Australian Society of Arts/SALA Festival Portrait Prize, Derivan Art Supplies Prize
 Royal South Australian Society of Arts Victor Zhang Portrait Prize 2015
 Whyalla Art Prize 2002
 Whyalla Art Prize 1998
 Finalist, Doug Moran Portrait Prize 2009 and 2011
 Finalist Doug Moran Portrait Prize 2001
Selected for the Salon des Refusés in 2014.

References

External links 
 Personal website
 Lecturer Profile: Daryl Austin
 Entry in Design & Art Australia Online

Living people
1964 births
Artists from South Australia
Australian contemporary artists
Artists from Adelaide
20th-century Australian male artists
21st-century Australian male artists
Australian art teachers